W. W. Hughes was an American football player and coach former head coach of the  Florida State college football program from 1902 to 1903.  He was the first person to coach a collegiate football at Florida State University, then known as Florida State College.  Over two years, Hughes compiled a record of 5–3–1.

Hughes was a player for Vanderbilt University, and was a Latin professor at Florida State College.  Upon his arrival at the college, he volunteered to coach the school's first football team.  He was succeeded in 1904 by Jack Forsythe.

Head coaching record

References

 

Year of birth missing
Year of death missing
Florida State Seminoles football coaches
Vanderbilt Commodores football players